Rose Laurens, previously billed as Rose Merryl (born Rose Podwojny; 4 March 1951 – 29 April 2018), was a French singer-songwriter, known for her 1982 single "Africa", a top-three hit in several European countries. She was also famous for portraying the character of Fantine, on the original 1980 French concept album of Les Misérables, singing "L'air de la misère" and "J'avais rêvé d'une autre vie" two songs later adapted into English as "On My Own" and "I Dreamed a Dream" respectively.

Discography

Albums
 1972 :  Sandrose  with Jean-Pierre Alarcen's eponymous band, one of the first and best French progressive-rock albums
 1980 : Les Misérables ("L'air de la misère", "J'avais rêvé d'une autre vie"...)
 1982 : Déraisonnable
 1983 : Vivre ("Mamy Yoko", "Zodiacale", "T'envole pas sans moi", "Esméralda", "Chasseur d'images"...)
 1984 : Africa – Voodoo Master ("Magic and music", "Misunderstanding", "I Need to Give", "Living in Your Song"...)
 1986 : Écris ta vie sur moi ("Quand tu pars", "La Nuit", "Je me jette à l'eau", "Profession reporter"...)
 1990 : J'te prêterai jamais
 1995 : Envie
 2001 : L'ombre d'un géant
 2015 : DNA

Compilations
 1986 : Rose Laurens – Compilation ("Quand tu pars", "Africa", "Mamy Yoko", "Vivre", "Je me jette à l'eau", "Profession reporter"...)
 1991 : 17 Grands Succès de Rose Laurens (Quebec)
 1996 : "The Very Best of Rose Laurens" ("Partir", "La Négresse blanche", "Écris ta vie sur moi", "Le Cœur chagrin", "Africa"...)

Singles
 1976 : "In Space" (under the name Rose Merryl)
 1977 : "L'Après amour" (under the name Rose Merryl)
 1978 : "Je suis à toi" (under the name Rose Merryl)
 1979 : "Survivre" (#45 in France)
 1979 : "À deux"
 1980 : "J'vous aime les oiseaux"
 1980 : "L'Air de la misère"
 1981 : "Pas facile"
 1982 : "Africa" (#1 in France)
 1983 : "Africa (Voodoo Master)" (export) (#1 in Austria, No. 2 in Switzerland, No. 2 in Norway, No. 3 in West Germany)
 1983 : "Mamy Yoko" (#10 in France)
 1983 : "Mamy Yoko" (export) (#37 in Germany)
 1983 : "Vivre" (#18 in France)
 1984 : "Danse moi" (#66 in France)
 1984 : "Night Sky" (export) (#12 in Sweden)
 1985 : "Cheyenne" (#75 in France)
 1985 : "Quand tu pars" (written by Francis Cabrel, No. 41 in France)
 1986 : "American Love" (export)
 1986 : "La Nuit" (#53 in France)
 1987 : "Où vont tous ceux qu'on aime ?"
 1989 : "Africa – Mégamix 89"
 1990 : "J'te prêterai jamais" (#96 in France)
 1991 : "Il a les yeux d'un ange"
 1994 : "Africa – Remix 94" (Germany)
 1995 : "Nous c'est fou"
 2001 : "Pour aimer plus fort" (#40 in France)
 2015 : "Si j'pars sur une île"

Collaborations
 1994 : Yves Duteil – Entre Elles et Moi – Song "Écris ta vie sur moi" in duet with Yves Duteil
 1995 : Gay Anthems – U.S. Compilation – Song "American love"

References

1951 births
2018 deaths
French singer-songwriters
French people of Polish descent
French women pop singers
Musicians from Paris